The Gambler (French: Le joueur) is a 1958 French-Italian drama film directed by Claude Autant-Lara and starring Gérard Philipe, Liselotte Pulver and Françoise Rosay. It is an adaptation of Fyodor Dostoevsky's 1866 novel The Gambler.

The film's sets were designed by the art director Max Douy. It was shot at the Billancourt Studios in Paris. It was made in Eastmancolor.

Cast
 Gérard Philipe as Alixei Ivanovitch 
 Liselotte Pulver as Pauline Zagorianski  
 Françoise Rosay as La tante Antonia  
 Jean Danet as Marquis des Grieux  
 Jean-Max as Le directeur de la banque  
 Nadine Alari as Blanche de Cominges  
 Sacha Pitoëff as Afpley 
 Suzanne Dantès as Mme de Cominges  
 Paul Esser 
 Pierre Jourdan 
 Julien Carette as Bagdovitch  
 Bernard Blier as Le Général Zagoriensky  
 Georges Bever as Un majordome au bal  
 Corrado Guarducci as Un joueur italien  
 Mona Dol as La baronne  
 Richard Francoeur as Le portier de l'hôtel  
 Gib Grossac as Un joueur  
 Alice Sapritch as Marfa  
 Jean Imbert 
 Georges Lycan as Un joueur  
 Roger Tréville as Un joueur anglais  
 Hans Verner 
 Jacques Marin as L'employé du casino qui cherche sous la table

References

Bibliography 
 James Monaco. The Encyclopedia of Film. Perigee Books, 1991.

External links 
 

1958 films
1950s historical drama films
French historical drama films
Italian historical drama films
1950s French-language films
Films based on The Gambler
Films directed by Claude Autant-Lara
Films shot at Billancourt Studios
Films set in Germany
Films set in 1863
Films about gambling
Gaumont Film Company films
1958 drama films
1950s French films
1950s Italian films